Somewhere I've Never Travelled is the second album by Ambrosia, and their final album on 20th Century Fox Records, released in 1976. The 1st pressings of the vinyl LP were issued in a custom "pyramid" cover, having 3 fold-out panels that turned the cover into a Pyramid.

The album peaked at #79 on the Billboard 200. None of its singles charted on the Billboard Hot 100.

Track listing

Personnel
Ambrosia
David Pack – guitar, lead and backing vocals, keyboards
Christopher North – keyboards, backing vocals
Joe Puerta – bass, lead and backing vocals
Burleigh Drummond – drums, lead and backing vocals, percussion, bassoon

Additional musicians
Ruth Underwood – marimba
Andrew Powell – orchestration (Tracks 3, 8, 10)
Ian Underwood – saxophone
Daniel Kobialka – violin

Production
Producer: Alan Parsons
Engineers: Alan Parsons, Tom Trefethen
Photography: Ed Caraeff Studio

Charts
Album

References

External links

Ambrosia (band) albums
1976 albums
20th Century Fox Records albums
Albums produced by Alan Parsons